Sri Lankan independence activists are those who are considered to have played a major role in the Sri Lankan independence movement from British Colonial rule during the 20th century.

List of prominent Sri Lankan independence activists
A. E. Goonesinha
N.M. Perera
Leslie Goonewardene
Vivienne Goonewardene
Philip Gunawardena
Colvin R. de Silva
Don Stephen Senanayake
Fredrick Richard Senanayake
 Don Charles Senanayake
Anagarika Dharmapala
Sir James Peiris
Sir Ponnambalam Ramanathan
Sir Ponnambalam Arunachalam
Sir Susantha de Fonseka
D. R. Wijewardena
E. W. Perera
George E. de Silva
Charles Edgar Corea
Victor Corea
Gratien Fernando
Henry Pedris
Arthur V. Dias
Wilmot A. Perera
Tuan Burhanudeen Jayah
M.C. Siddi Lebbe
C. W. W. Kannangara
W. A. de Silva
S. Mahinda
H. W. Amarasuriya
Thomas Amarasuriya
 H. Sri Nissanka

List of other Sri Lankan independence activists
Mark Anthony Bracegirdle
William de Silva
Pieter Keuneman
Doric de Souza
Armand de Souza
S. A. Wickramasinghe
Sir Edwin Wijeyeratne

See also
Uva Rebellion
Matale Rebellion
Suriya-Mal Movement
European Radicals in Sri Lanka
Sri Lankan independence movement
National Heroes of Sri Lanka

Sri Lankan independence movement
British Ceylon period
Sri Lankan independence activists
Lists of Sri Lankan people